La Ville fantôme is a Lucky Luke comic written by Goscinny and illustrated by Morris. The original French-language version was printed in 1965 by Dupuis. English editions of this comic have been published by Dargaud, and Cinebook in 2006, under the title Ghost Town.

Plot
While trekking through a mountain, Lucky Luke encounters two men, Denver Miles and Colorado Bill, who accompany him in his journey. They eventually come across Gold Hill, a town that has been abandoned for years. The only resident is Powell, an old, bitter and delusional miner, who threatens them with a shotgun. It is later revealed that in his young days, Powell was tricked into buying a gold mine that was salted by its previous owner. When the rumors spread that there was gold in the mountain, people rushed there and built the town of Gold Hill. But when no gold was found the people left as soon as they came. Powell refused to accept the fact and still believes that there is gold in his obviously worthless mine. Luke, Miles and Bill leaves for another town, Bingo Creek.

Miles and Bill are revealed to be con artists, who plan on buying Powell's mine, salt it and sell it back for a high price. Luke meanwhile begins to feel sympathy for Powell and decides to help him in his hard times. The con men are thwarted at every turn, but eventually Powell realizes the futility of his pursuit and agrees to sell the mine to them in a few days when the relevant authorities arrive in Bingo Creek. Miles and Bill proceed to salt the mine, however Bill gets hasty and has an article published in newspapers about the value of the mine causing another gold rush to begin. Powell is similarly excited and returns to his mine. However, as expected, no one finds anything and people believe that Powell is hiding all the gold for himself. Luke eventually forces Miles and Bill to confess the truth of their actions and they are tar-and-feathered and run out of town. The people prepare to leave Gold Hill once more, but Luke presents a passionate speech about true value of the land being more than the riches it could hold. Powell agrees with Luke and convinces many of the people to stay and help Gold Hill return to its former glory, albeit without the focus of gold mining.

Shortly before Luke leaves to continue his travels, Powell reveals that he has actually discovered a real vein of gold in his mine. Luke points out that should this information be revealed to the public, Gold Hill would return to its old ways and would most probably never revive this time. Powell eventually agrees and blows up his mine with Dynamite, ensuring that no one will ever know the truth and allowing Gold Hill to prosper as a normal town.

Characters 

 Powell: Old gold digger, half-crazed by the search for gold in his mine, which he bought when he was young, not knowing that it had been salted
 Colorado Bill: Small, blundering con-man, he is the scapegoat of Denver Miles
 Denver Miles: Professional cheater, he is responsible for salting the mine

References

 Morris publications in Spirou BDoubliées

External links
Lucky Luke official site album index 
Goscinny website on Lucky Luke

Comics by Morris (cartoonist)
Lucky Luke albums
1965 graphic novels
Works originally published in Spirou (magazine)
Works by René Goscinny
Comics set in Colorado